Freaks of Reality was a hip hop group from Toronto, best known for their 1995 Juno Award-nominated song, "Chi-Litchi-Latchi-Low". There is no record of band member names.

History
The group's first single,"Chi-Litchi-Latchi-Low",produced by 2rude was released by Steppin Bigga Records. It received regular rotation on Much Music. The band  hosted The Mix and Rap City.

"Chi-Litchi-Latchi-Low" was nominated for a 1995 Juno Award for Best Rap Recording. Not long after the Junos,  Steppin Bigga Records, went out of business… and then started a new label with the producer 2rude named Ill Vibe/Rudimental Productions (which became 2rude’s Rudimental Records)by 2rude.

References 

Black Canadian musical groups
Canadian hip hop groups
Musical groups from Toronto
Musical groups with year of establishment missing